The Voluntary Action History Society is a learned society that was established in 1991 to promote the historical study and understanding of charity, philanthropy and voluntary organisations. The society is based in the UK but has members and supporters internationally. The society was founded by a group of individuals working in both academia and the voluntary sector, including Colin Rochester (now an Honorary Research Fellow at Birkbeck College, University of London) and Justin Davis Smith (now the Chief Executive of Volunteering England), who felt that the history of voluntary action and charities was being forgotten or ignored.

History
The Voluntary Action History Society was formed because voluntary action was not seen as a subject its own right, often considered only as a minor part of social policy. Where it was studied historically it was as an insignificant aspect of social history. The founders believed that all too often studies undertaken were left to academics with little thought of the relevance to those active as researchers and practitioners in the voluntary sector. While some excellent histories of charities were available, they were rarely disseminated in the voluntary sector.

Since its inception the society has carried out a number of activities including running a series of seminars on the history of voluntary action, hosting conferences and workshops. The society became a registered charity in March 1995. It has also engaged with particular issues affecting the historical study of voluntary action, including the problems facing the archiving of charity history. In the 1990s the society conducted a survey of major voluntary organisations which revealed a number of challenges facing such organisations in archiving their records. In 2011 the society launched a new campaign for charity archives.

Activities
The Voluntary Action History Society carries out a number of activities including:

  Convenes the 'Voluntary Action Seminar' at the Institute of Historical Research, London
  Runs a programme of New Researchers’ workshops held throughout the UK
  Organises biennial research conferences and occasional conferences and symposia
  Edits a blog on topics of interest to historians and contemporary researchers of voluntary action
  Leads a campaign on charity archives, in partnership with others
  Facilitates a Transnational Histories of Voluntary Action network

References

External links
 Voluntary Action History Society
 Catalogue of the Voluntary Action History Society contained within the Volunteering England Collection, deposited at LSE Archives in March 2011

Voluntary Action History Society
Voluntary Action History Society
Voluntary Action History Society
1991 establishments in the United Kingdom